Kugu-Muminh (Wik-Muminh), also known as Kugu- or Wik-Nganhcara (Wikngenchera), is a Paman language spoken on the Cape York Peninsula of Queensland, Australia, by several of the Wik peoples. There are multiple dialects, only two of which are still spoken: Kugu-Muminh itself, and Kugu-Uwanh.

Phonology
Kugu Nganhcara consonant inventory

Kugu Nganhcara vowel inventory

References 

Wik languages
Endangered indigenous Australian languages in Queensland
Severely endangered languages